This is a list of all tornadoes that were confirmed by local offices of the National Weather Service in the United States from January to March 2016.

United States yearly total

January

January 6 event

January 7 event

January 9 event

January 15 event

January 17 event

January 21 event

January 22 event

January 27 event

January 28 event

February

February 2 event

February 3 event

February 15 event

February 16 event

February 23 event

February 24 event

March

March 1 event

March 3 event

March 7 event

March 8 event

March 10 event

March 12 event

March 13 event

March 14 event

March 15 event

March 19 event

March 23 event

March 24 event

March 27 event

March 29 event

March 30 event

March 31 event

See also
 Tornadoes of 2016
 List of United States tornadoes from April to May 2016

Notes

References

Tornadoes of 2016
2016 natural disasters in the United States
2016, 01
January 2016 events in the United States
February 2016 events in the United States
March 2016 events in the United States